Viktor Đukanović (born 29 January 2004) is a Montenegrin professional footballer who plays as a winger for Allsvenskan club Hammarby IF and the Montenegro national football team.

Club career

Budućnost
Đukanović started his youth career with Sutjeska Nikšić prior to moving to Budućnost in 2019. On 29 November 2020, he scored in his senior debut for the club at just 15 years old, coming on as a substitute in a 4-2 win against Rudar Pljevlja. In his debut season, he helped Budućnost finish first in the 2020–21 Montenegrin League title race and the 2021 Montenegrin Cup, making 23 competitive appearances and scoring three goals.

In the 2021–22 season, Đukanović established himself as a regular starter, starting 21 games and making 31 league appearances in total, scoring nine league goals. He also made his European debut in the 2021–22 UEFA Champions League qualifying rounds against HJK Helsinki, although Budućnost lost 7–1 on aggregate. Overall, Đukanović scored 13 goals in 38 appearances, contributing to the club's runner-up finish at the end of the 2021–22 season and the 2022 Montenegrin Cup win.

In 2022–23, his last season before leaving the club, Đukanović scored a brace against Llapi in the 2022–23 Conference League qualification phase, after which Budućnost was eliminated by Breiðablik. On 26 December 2022, Đukanović won the award Most Promising Player of the Year in the Montenegrin First League. He also finished third for the overall Player of the Year award, behind Novica Eraković from Sutjeska and Draško Božović from Dečić.

Hammarby
On 6 January 2023, Đukanović signed a five-year contract with Swedish Allsvenskan club Hammarby IF. The transfer fee was reportedly set at around €1 million, potential bonuses included.

International career
Đukanović has played for Montenegro's U17, U19, U21 and senior teams. He made his debut for the U17 team in a 2–1 loss to Bosnia & Herzegovina. He made nine appearances and scored four goals for the U17 side. As a U19 player, he made three appearances; he subsequently scored two goals in two appearances for the U21 selection.

On 14 June 2022, Đukanović made his senior national team appearance as a late substitute in a UEFA Nations League 3–0 win against Romania.

Honours

Budućnost
Montenegrin First League (1): 2020–21
Montenegrin Cup (2): 2020–21, 2021–22

Career statistics

Club

International

References

External links

2004 births
Living people
Association football midfielders
Montenegrin footballers
Montenegro youth international footballers
Montenegro international footballers
FK Budućnost Podgorica players
Hammarby Fotboll players
Montenegrin First League players